Disk Inventory X is a disk space analyzer utility for Mac OS X 10.3 and later. Inspired by WinDirStat, it shows the sizes of files and folders in a graphical treemap.

Version 1.3 of Disk Inventory X added support for macOS 10.15 Catalina, while the earlier version 1.2 added support for macOS 10.14 Mojave and its dark mode feature.

Reception
Mark Frauenfelder, founder of Boingboing, wrote in his book, Rule the Web: how to do anything and everything on the Internet—better, Disk Inventory X was his favorite way of uncovering disk-hogging files.
Download.com gave it 4 out of 5.

References

External links
 Official website

Disk usage analysis software